Fernando Ortíz (23 July 1923 – 31 October 2012) was a Mexican sailor. He competed in the Finn event at the 1964 Summer Olympics.

References

External links
 

1923 births
2012 deaths
Mexican male sailors (sport)
Olympic sailors of Mexico
Sailors at the 1964 Summer Olympics – Finn
Place of birth missing